Sir Julian Martin Flaux  (born 11 May 1955) is the Chancellor of the High Court.

Early life 
Flaux was born on 11 May 1955 and was educated at the King's School, Worcester. He studied law at Worcester College, Oxford, graduating as an Oxford MA and a Bachelor of Civil Law. He became an Honorary Fellow of Worcester College in 2017.

Career 
He was called to the bar by Inner Temple in 1978 and appointed as King's Counsel in April 1994.

He was appointed a Recorder in 2000, a Deputy Judge of the High Court of Justice in 2002, and a Judge of the High Court sitting on the King's Bench in 2007. He was a Presiding Judge on the Midland Circuit from January 2010 to December 2013, later appointed as a Legal Member of the Special Immigration Appeals Commission in 2013. Following a spell as Judge in Charge of the Commercial Court, he was appointed a Lord Justice of Appeal in December 2016 and sworn of the Privy Council. He was appointed Chancellor of the High Court on 3 February 2021.

In 2020, Flaux delivered the Court of Appeal's judgement in Begum v Home Secretary, granting Shamima Begum judicial review of the Home Secretary's decisions to revoke her British citizenship and to refuse her leave to enter the UK from Syria, where she had joined the Islamic State. The decision was reversed by the Supreme Court.

In December 2022, in a case brought by Alexander Darwall (owner of 4000 acres (16 km2) of land in southern Dartmoor National Park), he controversially ruled that a previously assumed right to wild camp without landowners' permission was legally wrong and that permission was needed.

References

1955 births
Living people
People educated at King's School, Worcester
Alumni of Worcester College, Oxford
Lords Justices of Appeal
Members of the Inner Temple
Members of the Privy Council of the United Kingdom
Queen's Bench Division judges
Knights Bachelor